Minnesota v. Mille Lacs Band of Chippewa Indians, 526 U.S. 172 (1999), was a United States Supreme Court decision concerning the usufructuary rights of the Ojibwe (Chippewa) tribe to certain lands it had ceded to the federal government in 1837. The Court ruled that the Ojibwe retained certain hunting, fishing, and gathering rights on the ceded land.

Background
Under the authority of the Treaty of St. Peters of 1837, also known as the "White Pine Treaty," the Ojibwe (Chippewa) Nations ceded a vast tract of lands stretching from what now is north-central Wisconsin to east-central Minnesota.  Article 5 of the treaty states, "The privilege of hunting, fishing, and gathering the wild rice, upon the lands, the rivers and the lakes included in the territory ceded, is guaranteed to the Indians, during the pleasure of the President of the United States."

The states of Michigan, Minnesota, and Wisconsin were later formed from various ceded territories, including the large tract from the White Pine Treaty. The government officials of these states asserted authority over hunting and fishing rights without regard for the treaty rights reserved by the Ojibwe.

From the 1960s to the 1990s, various bands of Ojibwe attempted to reassert their fishing rights on the Great Lakes. Those who did so were commonly arrested or harassed. This led to a series of lawsuits and protracted legal battles in each of the three states. The conflict culminated in the U.S. Supreme Court decision Minnesota v. Mille Lacs (1999).

Decision
The Court affirmed the rights of the Ojibwe to hunt, fish, and gather on the lands ceded by treaty, contingent upon a set of guidelines to protect the Great Lakes fisheries. This decision is an important victory for proponents of Native American sovereignty.

See also
 List of United States Supreme Court cases, volume 526
 List of United States Supreme Court cases
 Lists of United States Supreme Court cases by volume
 Wisconsin Walleye War

References

 Great Lakes Indian Fish & Wildlife Commission (1992).  A Guide to Understanding Chippewa Treaty Rights (Minnesota Edition: Rights, Regulation & Resource Management.  Odanah: Great Lakes Indian Fish & Wildlife Commission.
 McClurken, James M. (2000).  Fish in the Lakes, Wild Rice and Game in abundance.  East Lansing: Michigan State University Press.

External links
 Mille Lacs Band of Chippewa Indians v. Minnesota (1994)
 

United States Supreme Court cases
United States Supreme Court cases of the Rehnquist Court
United States Native American treaty case law
Ojibwe in Minnesota
Anishinaabe treaty areas
Anishinaabe culture
History of Minnesota
1999 in United States case law
1999 in Minnesota
Mille Lacs Band of Ojibwe